Géza Peske (1859–1934) was a Hungarian painter.

He was born in Kelecsény Austria-Hungary. He studied under Gyula Benczúr and Ludwig von Löfftz at the Academy of Munich. He lived in Budapest since 1894. His most famous pictures genre works with children there are at Hungarian National Gallery. He died and buried in Bodajk, Hungary, where a street bears his name.

Selected paintings

Sources 
 Art Encyclopaedia, Budapest, 1980 (Hungarian: Művészeti Lexikon, Akadémiai Kiadó, 1980)

1859 births
1934 deaths
19th-century Hungarian painters
20th-century Hungarian painters
Hungarian male painters
19th-century Hungarian male artists
20th-century Hungarian male artists